Potato latent virus is a plant virus that infects potatoes.

Carlaviruses
Viral plant pathogens and diseases